The 1965 World Table Tennis Championships – Corbillon Cup (women's team) was the 21st edition of the women's team championship.

China won the gold medal defeating Japan in the final 3–0. England won the bronze medal after beating Romania in the third place play off.

Medalists

Team

Corbillon Cup

Semifinal round

Group 1

Group 2

Third-place playoff

Final

See also
 List of World Table Tennis Championships medalists

References

-
1965 in women's table tennis